Aabhaasam is a 2018 Indian Malayalam-language social satirical film written and directed by Jubith Namradath. The film stars Suraj Venjaramoodu, Alencier Ley Lopez, Indrans, and Rima Kallingal.

Plot
'Aabhaasam' is a story told through a bus journey from Bangalore to Trivandrum, it dwells on the theme of suppressed urges of lust and the unapologetic inhumane acts that people find to satisfy it. The film unfolds the theme through instances of the story-line.

Cast 
 Suraj Venjaramoodu
 Indrans 
 Alencier Ley Lopez as Bus Driver
 Nassar as Police officer
 Rima Kallingal
 Gilu Joseph
 Abhija Sivakala
 Vijilesh Karayad
 Vijayakumar
 Saritha Kukku
 Divya Gopinath
 Nirmal Palazhi
 Anil Nedumangad
 Mamukkoya

References

External links 
 

2018 films
2010s Malayalam-language films
Indian satirical films
Films shot in Bangalore
Films shot in Thiruvananthapuram
2010s satirical films